Northwood is a station on the Watford branch of the Metropolitan line, in Travelcard Zone 6. The station is located just off the main road through the town, Green Lane. The line serves as the sole continuous link between the town of Northwood and London, key for a region known as Metro-Land.

The station is located on a four-track section of the Metropolitan line. The two platforms are on the slow lines. There are no platforms on the fast lines, as fast services do not stop at this station.

History
The station was opened on 1 September 1887 on the Metropolitan Railway's extension from the previous terminus at Pinner, en route to Rickmansworth. Northwood was rebuilt in the 1960s so that platforms would be on the Watford slow lines rather than the Amersham fast lines. In the original Crossrail plans, Crossrail would have connected to Aylesbury via the fast lines from Harrow to Rickmansworth and Northwood would have been an interchange with two extra platforms (meaning that the fast platforms at Moor Park would have been demolished) built on the fast lines. However, plans for this were dropped during the late 1990s.

Northwood used to be a terminus for many Metropolitan trains, similar to the status of Harrow-on-the-Hill and Neasden, due to the placement of two sidings. Nowadays when there are engineering works or delays near Northwood, trains would turn around there. The goods depot has been demolished and the station car park has replaced it. The sidings were also a role to load A60/A62 Stock and C69/C77 Stock trains onto lorries, where they went to scrap.

Services
In the northbound direction the station is served by trains to Watford (4tph), Amersham (2tph) and Chesham (2tph) trains (at peak times, 'fast' trains do not stop at stations between Harrow-on-the-Hill and Moor Park). In the southbound direction off-peak services generally run 4tph to Baker Street and 4tph to Aldgate.

Connections
London Buses routes 282, 331, H11 and non-TFL LSP route 508 serve the station.

References

Gallery

External links

Metropolitan line stations
Tube stations in the London Borough of Hillingdon
Former Metropolitan and Great Central Joint Railway stations
Railway stations in Great Britain opened in 1887